Carolyn Creedon (born 1969) Newport News, Virginia is an American poet.

Life
She left college and worked as a waitress in San Francisco.
She graduated from Smith College, Washington University in St. Louis, and the University of Virginia with an M.F.A.

Her work has appeared in The American Poetry Review, The Massachusetts Review, Yale Review.

She wrote a letter in support of the Green Street Cafe.

She is married to Paul Andrews.
She lives in Charlottesville, Virginia.

Awards
2008 Study Abroad Programs in Arts and Writing Contest runner-up 
2005 Glascock poetry prize
Academy of American Poets prize

Works
Wet: Poems, Kent State University Press, 2012,

Anthologies

 
 
Mary Esselman, Elizabeth Velez, eds. You Drive Me Crazy: Love Poems for Real Life Hachette Digital, Inc., 2008, 
"for the woman painter, because things grow"; "dear god i"; "bonepsalm", serve
"How to Be a Cowgirl in a Studio Apartment", Rattle #32, Winter 2009

Ploughshares

References

External links

1969 births
Living people
People from Newport News, Virginia
Smith College alumni
University of Virginia alumni
American women poets
21st-century American poets
21st-century American women writers
Washington University in St. Louis alumni